Keep Laughing is a 1932 American Pre-Code comedy film directed by Fatty Arbuckle.

Cast
 Monte Collins
 Addie McPhail
 Bryant Washburn
 Dorothy Granger
 George Davis

See also
 Fatty Arbuckle filmography

External links

1932 films
Films directed by Roscoe Arbuckle
1932 comedy films
1932 short films
Educational Pictures short films
American black-and-white films
American comedy short films
Films with screenplays by Jack Townley
1930s English-language films
1930s American films